Charles Frederick Kurfess (born February 1, 1930) is a former member of the Ohio House of Representatives, serving as Speaker of the House for part of his career. He was first elected in 1956 to an at large district, and was elected eleven times following. Following his retirement from politics, he went on to serve as a judge on the Wood County Court of Common Pleas. He also worked under Presidents Richard Nixon and Gerald Ford. He earned his B.A. degree from Bowling Green State University, where he was initiated as a member of Phi Kappa Tau, and earned his J.D. degree from the Ohio State University Law School in 1957.

References

External links

Republican Party members of the Ohio House of Representatives
Speakers of the Ohio House of Representatives
Living people
Bowling Green State University alumni
1930 births
Ohio State University Moritz College of Law alumni